José Antonio Gómez Álvarez de Eulate (born 10 May 1955) is a Spanish retired football forward and coach.

Playing career
Born in Salamanca, Region of León, Eulate moved to Ponferrada at the age of two and was a CD Santa Marta youth graduate. After making his debut as a senior with SD Ponferradina in 1973, he joined La Liga club Real Betis in January 1975. He was yielded in Jerez Industrial C.F.

Eulate was rarely used by the Andalusians during his spell, but was part of the squad that won the Copa del Rey in 1977 against Athletic Bilbao, playing the second half of extra time and converting his penalty shootout attempt (8–7 win in Madrid). In January 1979, he was loaned to neighbouring Recreativo de Huelva also in the top tier, and after suffering relegation he signed for Segunda División team Levante UD.

Eulate was an ever-present figure for the Valencian side, experiencing another relegation in 1982. After two seasons at Albacete Balompié, in Segunda División B, he returned to his first club Ponferradina, retiring in 1989 at the age of 34.

Coaching career
After retiring, Eulate worked as a manager, his first stop being at CA Bembibre in Tercera División, in 1991. After another spell at CD As Pontes, he was named Ponferradina coach in 1994.

Dismissed in October 1995, Eulate returned to Atlético Bembibre in 2001.

Honours
Betis
Copa del Rey: 1976–77

References

External links

Beticopedia profile 
Aúpa Deportiva profile 

1955 births
Living people
Sportspeople from Salamanca
Spanish footballers
Footballers from Castile and León
Association football forwards
La Liga players
Segunda División players
Segunda División B players
Tercera División players
SD Ponferradina players
Real Betis players
Recreativo de Huelva players
Levante UD footballers
Albacete Balompié players
Spanish football managers
SD Ponferradina managers
20th-century Spanish people